Siyaljori  is a village in the Chandankiyari CD block in the Chas subdivision of the Bokaro district in the Indian state of Jharkhand.

Geography

Location
It is located 17 km from Bokaro Steel City and 6 km from Chandankiyari.

Area overview
Bokaro district consists of undulating uplands on the Chota Nagpur Plateau with the Damodar River cutting a valley right across. The East Bokaro Coalfield located in the Bermo-Phusro area and small intrusions of Jharia Coalfield make Bokaro a coal rich district. In 1965, one of the largest steel manufacturing units in the country, Bokaro Steel Plant, operated by Steel Authority of India Limited, was set-up at Bokaro Steel City. The Damodar Valley Corporation established its first thermal power station at Bokaro (Thermal). The soil is generally infertile and agriculture is mostly rain-fed.

Note: The map alongside presents some of the notable locations in the district. All places marked in the map are linked in the larger full screen map.

Civic administration

Police station
Siyaljori police station is located at Siyaljori.

Demographics
According to the 2011 Census of India, Silajuri had a total population of 4,954, of which 3,080 (62%) were males and 1,874 (38%) were females. Population in the age range 0-6 years was 586. The total number of literate persons in Silajuri was 3,134 (88.17% of the population over 6 years).

Economy
Electrosteel Steels Limited, whose initial promoters were the Kolkata-based Kejriwal family of the Electrosteel Group, whose flagship is the ductile iron pipe pioneers, Electrosteel Castings, was setting up a 2.51 million tonnes per annum integrated steel plant at Sialjory. The company had acquired 1,723.44 hectares of land for the plant. Vedanta Limited acquired control of Electrosteels Steels Limited in 2018.

References

Villages in Bokaro district